Kyzyl-Kul (Qıźılkül) is a rural locality (a village) in Nizhnekaryshevsky Selsoviet, Baltachevsky District, Bashkortostan, Russia. The population was 22 as of 2010. There is 1 street.

Geography 
Kyzyl-Kul is located 34 km south of Starobaltachevo (the district's administrative centre) by road. Kyzyl Vostok is the nearest rural locality.

References 

Rural localities in Baltachevsky District